No. 186 Squadron of the Royal Air Force was formed on 1 April 1918 at East Retford, providing night pilot training for home defence and on the Western front. On 31 December 1918 it was reformed as an operational shipboard unit aboard . In 1919, the squadron became a torpedo development unit, renumbering to become 210 Squadron on 1 February 1920.

The Squadron reformed again, on 27 April 1943, at RAF Drem as a fighter-bomber squadron, eventually receiving its first Hurricanes in August, after transferring to RAF Ayr, converting to Typhoons and later, Spitfire VBs. The squadron was renumbered as 130 squadron on 5 April 1944.

Six months later, on 5 October 1944, The squadron was reformed as a Bomber Command Lancaster unit, based at Tuddenham, and flew its first bombing raid 13 days later. The squadron was disbanded on 17 July 1945.

Notes

186 squadron
186 squadron